Judith Veronica Mowatt,  (born 1952) is a Jamaican reggae artist. As well as being a solo artist, from 1974 she was also a member of the I Threes, the trio of backing vocalists for Bob Marley & The Wailers.

Early life
Mowatt was born in Gordon Town, St. Andrew Parish, Jamaica. At the age of 13, she became a member of a dance troupe which toured Jamaica and other islands in the Caribbean. Her initial ambition was to become a registered nurse. Her earliest musical influences were Aretha Franklin, Otis Redding, Curtis Mayfield, Dionne Warwick, Bob Marley, Marcia Griffiths, The Staple Singers and The Soulettes. A coincidental meeting with two teenage girls who were earlier in her dance troupe led to the formation of the Gaylettes, in 1967.

Career
In 1974, Mowatt got her big break by joining Bob Marley's backing vocal trio the "I Threes".

Her Black Woman album (Ashandan, 1979) came out the same year as I Three member Marcia Griffiths's album At Studio One. It is considered by many critics to be the greatest reggae album by a female artist. It was also the first reggae album recorded by a woman acting as her own producer.

She became the first female singer nominated for a Grammy Award in the category of reggae music when her Working Wonders album was nominated in 1985.

Formerly a member of the Rastafari movement, in the late 1990s she converted to Christianity and now sings Gospel music.

In 1999 the Jamaican government made her an Officer of the Order of Distinction for "services to music".

Identity mixup 
Some sources wrongfully assumed Judy Mowatt to be identical to Jean Watt (the longtime wife of Bunny Livingston/Wailer). This mixup possibly originated from Mowatt using several different stage names, for legal reasons, in the early 1970’s: Julianne, Julie-Ann, and Jean. Bunny Wailer credited his wife, Jean Watt for writing some of the tracks recorded during sessions for the album Burnin' (1973): "Hallelujah Time", “Pass It On" and "Reincarnated Soul”.  The latter song first appeared on a single as B Side to “Concrete Jungle” and later - with the name changed to "Reincarnated Souls" – on Bunny Wailer's first solo album Blackheart Man (1976).

Discography
 Mellow Mood (1975), Tuff Gong
 Black Woman (1979), Ashandan / (1980), Grove Music (Island Records)
 Mr. Dee-J (1981), Ashandan
 Only A Woman (1982), Shanachie
 Working Wonders (1985), Ashandan
 Love Is Overdue (1986), Shanachie
 I Shall Sing (1991), Trojan Records
 Look at Love (1991), Koch International / Shanachie
 Rock Me (1993), Pow Wow
 Love (1998), African Love / Jet Star
 Something Old, Something New (2002), Judy M Music/Tuff Gong International
 Sing Our Own Song (2003), Shanachie

with the I Three
 Beginning (1986), Tuff Gong / EMI - with Rita Marley and Marcia Griffiths, credited to 'I-Three'

with the Gaylettes
We Shall Sing (Girl Group Rocksteady, Reggae And Soul 1967-73) (2001), Westside (compilation)
Rescue Me (1967-1973) (2016), Roots Reggae Library (compilation)

References

 

1952 births
Living people
Jamaican reggae musicians
Musicians from Kingston, Jamaica
The Wailers members
Roots Reggae Library
Converts to the Rastafari movement
Converts to Christianity
Officers of the Order of Distinction
Former Rastafarians
Jamaican gospel singers
Shanachie Records artists
Greensleeves Records artists
Trojan Records artists